Jacques Burtin (born 10 November 1955) is a French composer, writer, producer and filmmaker.

Biography 

After studying Literature and Art at La Sorbonne (Paris), he was introduced to the kora by brother Dominique Fournier at the Abbey of Bec Hellouin (Normandy, France) and by brother Dominique Catta, composer and choirmaster of the Keur Moussa Monastery (Senegal). He began to compose for the kora, solo pieces as well as duets with Western instruments.

His works are inspired by poets like Grace Schulman and Christian Bobin, spiritual authors like St. John of the Cross or Etty Hillesum, writers like Georges Simenon or Hermann Hesse, painters like Henri Matisse or Jean-Michel Basquiat, or photographers like Nan Goldin or Diane Arbus. He collaborates with artists, dancers and poets and conceives interdisciplinary performances.

Jacques Burtin is also involved in improvised music and has given concerts based on improvisation with harpist Susan Allen (musician), French panflute player Jean-Claude Mara, Japanese koto player Damien Harada, and French saxophonist Tullia Morand.

In 1997, Jacques Burtin meets Susan Allen (musician), harpist, professor of harp and improvisation at CalArts (California Institute of the Arts). From their meeting until Susan Allen's passing in 2015, they see each other on a regular basis to improvise, give performances and exchange on musical pedagogy. In 2007, they release the CD Renaissance. After the death of Susan Allen, Jacques Burtin pays tribute to the American harpist by creating a dedicated website with unreleased testimonies, musical creations specially written by composers of all horizons and unpublished videos of their Paris sessions (harp and kora improvisations).

Between 2002 and 2012, Jacques Burtin gives seminars on Improvisation and Interdisciplinary Creation in the Faculty of Fine Arts School of the University of Basque Country, Bilbao, Spain, in collaboration with Spanish Choreographer Alicia Gómez Linares.

In 2004, he is invited by the Paul Verlaine University (Metz, France) to participate to the Colloque sur l'Art du Peu (Seminar on the Art of the Few): he gives a solo kora performance based on haikus and writes an essay: La Tentation du peu (The Temptation of the Few).

On 12 May 2006 his music is featured among the works of twelve composers from around the world in Sonic Channels, a concert hosted by the New School University and the Lower Manhattan Cultural Council.

Since 2006, Jacques Burtin also plays the gravi-kora and composes for this instrument. He gives kora and gravi-kora master classes and works on kora pedagogy.

Jacques Burtin writes, produces and directs poetic and experimental short films as well as documentaries on contemporary artists. His films What damns me saves me and The Dialogue of Shadows were screened at the Festival de Cannes in 2011 and 2012. The Child of La République was screened at the Bilbao Short Film Festival Zinebi in 2015.

Burtin is currently working on a multidisciplinary project based on the twenty-two Major Arcana of the Tarot of Marseille. An homage to his late colleague, harpist Susan Allen (musician), this project explores the creative act via improvisation.

Musical works 

 1986 – Ballade de l'île d'Yeu, for solo kora
 1988 – L'Annonce à Zacharie (The Announcement to Zacharias), for viola and kora
 1989 – Tant et tant d'amour (A Love so great, so deep), suite for flute and kora inspired by Georges Simenon's autobiography Mémoires intimes.
 1989 – La Passion selon saint Jean (The Passion according to Saint John), oratorio for tenor, kora and two narrators
 1990 – Le Maître du Haut Château (The Man in the High Castle), suite for piano, kora, saxophone and synthesizers inspired by Philip K. Dick's novel.
 1991 – Le Jeu des perles de verre (The Glass Bead Game), suite for flute, viola, guitar and three koras inspired by Hermann Hesse's novel.
 1992 – Ave Maria for soprano a capella
 1993 – Les Nus bleus (Blue Nudes), suite for solo flute inspired by the paper cutouts of Henri Matisse
 1996 – L'Amour – Musiques pour Thérèse (Love – Music for Thérèse), suite for kora, recorder, cello and koto
 1997 – Music for Michael Lonsdale's play Vous m'appellerez Petite Thérèse
 1998 – La Traversée de Bilbao, dedicated to Nan Goldin, for voice, saxophone and tapes.
 1998 – Music for Benoît Lardières's play Les sept vies d'Homère Petitbois (The Seven lives of Homère Petitbois)
 1999 – Où est ton coeur, est la musique (Where is your Heart, is Music), for accordion and kora
 2001 – Eloge de la Lumière (Praise for the Light) for kora, violin and electric guitar
 2001 – Apuntes de Eduardo Chillida (Eduardo Chillida's Notes), for a violin, a kora, a dancer and a narrator
 2001 – Six chants syldaves (Six Syldavian Songs), for cello and kora
 2002 – Music for Algis Arlauskas's film Carta a mi madre (A Letter to my Mother)
 2002 – Lumière du monde (Light of the World), improvised suite for synthesizer, sampler and a Tibetan bell
 2003 – Nouveaux chants syldaves (New Syldavian Songs) for viola and kora
 2004 – Your Shadow Will Shine – Requiem Notebook, electroacoustic music – a Tribute to Victims and Survivors of 9/11 and other terrorist attacks
 2006 – One Thousand Sources, for solo kora, dedicated to Susan Allen (musician).
 2006 – Days of Wonder, suite for solo kora, inspired by the Book of Poems by Grace Schulman
 2007 – L'Or jeté au fleuve (Gold thrown into the River), Kora Sonata No.1, in memory of Yves Klein
 2007 – Music soundtrack for seven art documentaries by Vincent Gille (on the works of Max Ernst, Joan Miró, Sophie Calle, Paul Klee, the Menil Collection...)
 2008 – Le Chant de la Forêt (The Song of the Forest), suite for kora, gravi-kora, flute and viola
 2010 – Une clarté, une voix, un parfum... (A Brightness, A Voice, A Perfume...), Kora Sonata No 2
 2013 – L'Enfance de l'Art, Suite for Gravi-kora n°1
 2015 – Le Silence après la pluie, Suite for Kora n°6, inspired by the work of Christian Bobin and dedicated to him
 2017 – Lazarus, for piano and soprano

Poetic, Experimental and Documentary films

 1977 : L'Innocence du grand large, an experimental film written, produced and directed by Jacques Burtin and Vincent Gille, Super 8, 20'20
 1977 : Corps à corps, an experimental film written, produced and directed by Jacques Burtin and Bruno Montpied, Super 8, 12mn
 1979 : Préface, an experimental film written, produced and directed by Jacques Burtin, Super 8, 41mn
 1981 : Les Vacances de Platon, an experimental film written, produced and directed by Jacques Burtin and Vincent Gille, Super 8, 15mn
 1982 : Magnificat, an experimental film written, produced and directed by Jacques Burtin and Vincent Gille, Super 8, 11'30
 1982 : Brèves, an experimental film produced and directed by Jacques Burtin and Vincent Gille, written by Vincent Gille, Super 8, 10mn
 1984 : Neuf Lettres, an experimental film written, produced and directed by Jacques Burtin, Super 8, 23'33
 1997 – Autoportraits (Selfportraits), an experimental film written, produced and directed by Jacques Burtin, with Agnès Rivière, Vincent Gille and Jacques Burtin, music by Jacques Burtin, Hi8, 4:3, 34mn
 2005 – Transmigration, a documentary film on the Czech artist Filomena Boreckà, written, produced and directed by Jacques Burtin, DV, 4:3, 15mn
 2005 – L'autre regard (The Other View), a documentary film on the painter Alexandre Hollan, written, produced and directed by Jacques Burtin, music by Jacques Burtin, DV, 4:3, 19mn
 2010 – Bilbao Dream, an experimental film written and directed by Jacques Burtin, produced by Iñigo Lopez and Jacques Burtin, with Mónica Serrano, Robin Caballero and Javier Cortés, music by Jacques Burtin, HD, 16:9, 6mn
 2011 – Oxymorons, a documentary film on the Czech artist Filomena Boreckà, produced and directed by Jacques Burtin, music by Jacques Burtin, HD, 16:9, 8mn31
 2011 – Les Carnets d'Enza, a documentary film on Enza Palamara's work, written, produced and directed by Jacques Burtin, music by Jacques Burtin, DV, 4:3, 28mn
 2011 – Ce qui me perd me sauvera ("What Damns Me Saves Me"), an experimental film written, produced and directed by Jacques Burtin, music by Jacques Burtin, HD, 16:9, 7mn
 2011 – Le Dernier Kodachrome ("The Last Kodachrome"), an experimental film written, produced and directed by Jacques Burtin, with Valérie Maes, Joseph Morder, Elina Labourdette, Enza Palamara, Philippe Bernier et Gabor Deshors, music by Jacques Burtin, HD, 16:9, 37min
 2012 – Le Dialogue des Ombres ("The Dialogue of Shadows"), an experimental film written, produced and directed by Jacques Burtin, voices by Valérie Maes and Jacques Burtin, music by Jacques Burtin, HD, 16:9, 16'22
 2013 – Le Crime sans fin ("The Endless Crime"), an experimental film written, produced and directed by Jacques Burtin, voices by Valérie Maes and Jacques Burtin, music by Jacques Burtin, HD, 16:9, 16'
 2015 – Portrait de l'Artiste en Alchimiste et en Guerrier ("A Portrait of the Artist as an Alchemist and a Warrior"), a documentary film written and directed by Jacques Burtin, produced by Françoise Murillo, on the work of French painter Thierry Guého, music by Jacques Burtin, HD, 16:9, 24'
 2015 – L'Enfant de la République ("The Child of La République"), a poetic, biographical and experimental film written and directed by Jacques Burtin, produced by Françoise Murillo, voices by Bernard Métraux and Jacques Burtin, texts by Tristan Corbière and Jacques Burtin, music by Jacques Burtin, HD, 16:9, 24'
 2015 – Rencontre avec Roméo, a documentary film directed by Jacques Burtin, written by Jacques Burtin and Bruno Montpied, produced by Françoise Murillo, with French outsider artist Roméo Gérolami, music by Jacques Burtin, HD, 16:9, 18'
 2017 – Les Îles de Lumière (Islands of Light), a film inspired on Christian Bobin's works, written, produced and directed by Jacques Burtin, music by Jacques Burtin (fourth movement of the Kora Sonata n°4), 8'

Writings 
 1991 – Sacres, nine prose poems, La Goutte d'Eau, Paris
 2004 – La Tentation du Peu (Temptation of the Few), in Actes du colloque de Metz 2004, Christine Dupouy Editor, L'Harmattan, Paris, 2008
 2005 – Sang céleste – Lettre à Filomena Boreckà (Celestial Blood – Letter to Filomena Boreckà)
 2008 – Le Dialogue de la forêt (The Dialog in the Forest), a conversation with Odile Portal
 2009 – Chemins de l'art, chemins de l'âme – Musique, art et prière (Paths of Art, Paths of Soul – Music, Art and Prayer), an Introduction to the 3-CD Box Set Le Jour des Merveilles, Bayard Musique
 2002–2010 – De la improvisación (About Improvisation), notes on improvisation for the Fine Arts Students of the Basque Country University
 2012 - Les Origines, a conversation with Marie Zénon.

Discography 

 1990 – Jacques Burtin, Promenades heureuses – Le Maître du haut château, La Goutte d'Eau
 1991 – Jacques Burtin, Le Chant des étoiles", Rosée de Lumière
 1993 – Jacques Burtin, Noir & Or, Rosée de Lumière
 1994 – Jacques Burtin, Kora à l'Abbaye du Bec-Hellouin (Le Chant intérieur), Studio SM
 1995 – Jacques Burtin et Jean-Claude Mara, Psalmodies, Mara Productions
 1996 – Jacques Burtin, L'Amour (Musiques pour Thérèse), Studio SM
 1997 – Jacques Burtin & Soeur Claire Marie Ledoux, Une Rosée de lumière (Saint François et Sainte Claire d'Assise), with the voices of Béatrice Agenin and Michael Lonsdale, Studio SM
 1998 – Jacques Burtin, Comme un cercle de feu sur l'eau, Edition limitée
 2001 – Jacques Burtin & Barbara Marcinkowska, Méditation Kora et Violoncelle, Bayard Musique (re-issued in 2010)
 2003 – Jacques Burtin & Michel Michalakakos, Méditation Kora et Alto, Bayard Musique
 2007 – Jacques Burtin & Susan Allen, Renaissance (kora and harp improvisations)
 2008 – Jacques Burtin, Le Chant de la forêt, with Jean Ferrandis and Michel Michalakakos, Bayard Musique
 2009 – Jacques Burtin, Le Jour des merveilles, Bayard Musique
 2012 – Jacques Burtin, Kora Noël, ADF-Studio SM
 2016 - Jacques Burtin, Kora au Château de Saint-Fargeau - Musiques du Silence, Mysterium Conjunctionis

 Sheet music 
 1988 – Une Rosée de lumière – Neuf pièces pour kora, Monastère de Keur Moussa
 1994 – Le Chant intérieur – Pièces et suites pour kora, Editions Musicales Studio SM
 2006 – One Thousand Sources, dedicated to Susan Allen (musician)
 2006 – Diptyque du Bonheur, dedicated to Mary Ann Caws and Dr. Boyce Bennet (includes "Danseuse espagnole" and "La Vie lumineuse et lente")
 2010 – Joies soudaines – Oeuvres pour kora 1988–2010 2010 – Days of Wonder, dedicated to Grace Schulman 
 2010 – L'Or jeté au fleuve, Sonata for kora n°1
 2012 – Kora Noël, Eighteen Christmas tunes for kora
 2013 – Le Château de l'âme, Suite for kora n°1, inspired by The Interior Castle of Teresa of Ávila
 2013 – Une Clarté, une Voix, un Parfum, Sonata for kora n°2, inspired by the Confessions of Saint Augustine
 2013 – L'Enfance de l'Art, Suite for gravi-kora n°1, dedicated to Robert Grawi
 2013 – Le Fantôme de Haydn ou la Sonate sans fin, Sonata for kora n°3, dedicated to Philippe Sollers
 2016 – Le Silence après la pluie'', Sonata for kora n°4, dedicated to Christian Bobin

References

External links
  Official Website
 
Tribute to Susan Allen A website conceived and edited by Jacques Burtin, with testimonies, unreleased videos and new music composed by Susan Allen's friends and collaborators.
  La Kora : tradition et histoire à l'Abbaye de Keur Moussa au Sénégal (The Kora – Tradition and History in the Keur Moussa Abbey in Senegal):
  Videos : Keur Moussa Abbey and the kora

1955 births
Contemporary classical composers
Contemporary classical music performers
French classical composers
French male classical composers
Kora players
21st-century classical composers
Postmodern artists
French experimental filmmakers
Living people
21st-century French composers
21st-century French male musicians